Hillsview is a town in McPherson County, South Dakota, United States. The population was 2 at the 2020 census. Hillsview is the least-populated municipality in South Dakota.

The town was named because of its lofty elevation.

Geography

Demographics

2010 census
As of the census of 2010, there were 3 people, 1 households, and 1 families residing in the town. The racial makeup of the town was 100.0% White.

There was 1 household of which 100.0% was married couples living together. 0.0% of all households were made up of individuals. The average household size was 3.00 and the average family size was 3.00.

The median age in the town was 53.5 years. 0.0% of residents were under the age of 18; 33.3% were between the ages of 18 and 24; 0.0% were from 25 to 44; 66.7% were from 45 to 64; and 0.0% were 65 years of age or older. The gender makeup of the town was 33.3% female and 66.7% male.

2000 census
As of the census of 2000, there were 3 people, 1 household, and 1 family residing in the town. The population density was 4.7 people per square mile (1.8/km2). There were 2 housing units at an average density of 3.1 per square mile (1.2/km2). The racial makeup of the town was 100% White.

There was 1 household, a married couple living together. The household size was 3 and the family size was 3.

In the town, the population was spread out, with 33.3% from 25 to 44, 33.3% from 45 to 64, and 33.3% who were 65 years of age or older.  The median age was 64 years. There were 2 men and 1 woman.

References

Towns in McPherson County, South Dakota
Towns in South Dakota